The Trans-Mongolian Railway follows an ancient tea-caravan route from China to Russia and connects Ulan-Ude, on the Trans–Baikal (Trans–Siberian) railway in Russia, with the Chinese city of Jining, by way of Ulaanbaatar in Mongolia.

Other important stops are Sükhbaatar, Darkhan, Choir, and Zamyn-Üüd/Erenhot (border crossing and gauge-changing station). The line was built between 1949 and 1961. In most of Mongolia, it is single track, and in China double track. There are important branches leading to Erdenet and Baganuur.

History 

Railway development came late to Mongolia. Construction of the Trans-Mongolian line began in 1947, reaching Ulan Bator from the north in 1950 and the Chinese border in 1955. Before that the only railways in Mongolia had been a  line (opened in 1938) connecting the coal mines at Nalaikh to the capital and a Soviet-built  freight-only branch (completed in 1939) from Borzya on the Trans-Siberian Railway to Bayantümen, Dornod near Choibalsan in north-eastern Mongolia.

The railway was first built by a mix of Gulag convicts from the Soviet Union as well as mobilised Mongolians. In 1946, 40'000 convicts were exiled to Mongolia to build the railway.

Russian Irkutsk State University of Railway Engineering opened its Ulaanbaatar branch in June 2009.

Operation 
Mongolian national railway operator Ulaanbaatar Tömör Zam (Ulaanbaatar Railway JVC) carries 80% of all freight and 30% of all passenger transport within Mongolia. In the aftermath of the 1990 Democratic revolution freight traffic was reduced by about half, but by 2005 had almost returned to previous levels. Passenger numbers had already reached the old levels again by 2001, with 4.1 million passengers. Most trains are headed by at least two locomotives.

For this reason through carriages between the two countries must have their bogies changed at the border. Each carriage has to be lifted in turn to have its bogies changed and the whole operation, combined with passport and customs control, can take several hours. goods wagons likewise have their bogies exchanged at this break-of-gauge.

Ownership
While state owned, there are plans to sell 51% of the shares to investors to finance the enlarged network.

New lines
In October 2014, the Mongolian government announced its intention to build large-scale transport infrastructure projects to boost mineral shipments from Russia to China via the Trans Mongolian Railway. A 547km line will be constructed from Erdenet to Ovoot. "In addition this new railway will bring major economic and social benefits to Northern Mongolian provinces as economic development and regional integration is fast-tracked" said the managing director of Aspire Mining, the company in charge of the railway construction.

Mongolian Railway State Owned Share Holding Company has received a license to build a new railway network to allow for exports of the mining sector in 2011. First phase of the construction will be a Dalanzadgad–Tavantolgoi–Tsagaansuvarga–Zuunbayan–Sainshand–Baruun Urt–Khoot–Choibalsan alignment about 1100 km long in Russian gauge.

As of spring 2012, MTZ SOSC began the construction work.

One smaller line already attaches to the Chinese network in western Mongolia from Nariin Sukhait (coal mine) to Shiveekhüren (Chinese border) for 45km.

Further lines planned are Ukhaa Khudag (part of the Tavan Tolgoi coal field) - Oyu Tolgoi (copper/gold mine) - Gashuun Sukhait (Chinese border) of ca. 260 km in Chinese standard gauge.

Gallery

See also 

Rail transport in Mongolia
Trans-Siberian Railway

References

 
 Omrani, Bijan. Asia Overland: Tales of Travel on the Trans-Siberian and Silk Road Odyssey Publications, 2010

External links
 Mongolian Railway company - official site
 Mongolian Incoming Railway Tour Operator since 1997!- official site

Railway lines in Mongolia
Rail transport in Mongolia
Rail infrastructure in Mongolia
Mongolia–Soviet Union relations
China–Mongolia relations
China–Soviet Union relations
Soviet foreign aid
Chinese foreign aid